Jill Ross-Giffen (born 23 February 1958) is a Canadian retired track and field athlete who competed in the heptathlon and women's pentathlon. She represented Canada in the heptathlon at the 1984 Summer Olympics. Ross-Giffen won a bronze medal at the 1979 Pan American Games and at the 1982 Commonwealth Games. She was the former Canadian national record holder in the pentathlon before that record was broken by Brianne Theisen-Eaton.

References

Canadian heptathletes
Olympic track and field athletes of Canada
Athletes (track and field) at the 1984 Summer Olympics
Commonwealth Games bronze medallists for Canada
Athletes (track and field) at the 1978 Commonwealth Games
Athletes (track and field) at the 1982 Commonwealth Games
Commonwealth Games medallists in athletics
Pan American Games bronze medalists for Canada
Athletes (track and field) at the 1979 Pan American Games
Athletes (track and field) at the 1983 Pan American Games
Pan American Games medalists in athletics (track and field)
1958 births
Living people
Athletes from London, Ontario
Canadian female track and field athletes
Medalists at the 1979 Pan American Games
Medallists at the 1982 Commonwealth Games